Poupartia is a genus of plant in family Anacardiaceae. From the islands of Madagascar, Mauritius, Rodrigues and Réunion, all in the Indian Ocean.

Taxonomy
The genus name of Poupartia is in honour of François Poupart (d. 1708), a French physician, anatomist and entomologist. It was first described and published in Gen. Pl. on page 372 in 1789.

Species
, Plants of the World online has 8 accepted species: 
 Poupartia borbonica J.F.Gmelin
 Poupartia castanea 
 Poupartia chapelieri (Guillaumin) H. Perrier
 Poupartia gummifera 
 Poupartia minor (Bojer) L.Marchand
 Poupartia orientalis Capuron ex Randrianasolo & J.S.Mill.
 Poupartia pubescens Marchand
 Poupartia silvatica

Note
Poupartia caffra H.Perrier, the Sakoa tree from Madagascar, is a synonym of Sclerocarya birrea subsp. caffra (Sond.) Kokwaro

References

 
Anacardiaceae genera
Taxonomy articles created by Polbot
Plants described in 1789
Flora of Madagascar
Flora of Mauritius
Flora of Réunion
Flora of Rodrigues